Suryachaur is a Hill station to see the Langtang Himalayan Range as well as entire Likhu Valley of Nuwakot District in Bagmati Province of central Nepal.

Surya chaur is a Nice view point of the chain of Mountain range like Mt Manaslu 8153 meter, Ganesh Himal, Mt Langtang Lirung, Mt Dorje Lhakpa and holy Gaurishankar.

This is one of the easiest hiking areas near Kathmandu. You will cross the old and cultural city Tokha while you go to hike there by your vehicle. You need to pay the fees for National park because this lies in Shivapuri Nagarjun National Park in check post. You can either take your vehicle which is quite comfortable but they charge for vehicle entry fee or go by Hike.
   
Most of the people from Kathmandu go there to enjoy nature and take a rest. There is a primary school and small village, if you go there in the May you can taste the yellow berry. This place is very near to Gurje Bhanjyang.

Road to Suryachaur 

There is a black top road to Gurje Bhanjyang which goes to Nuwakot and Rasuwa. Gurje Bhanjyang is the place where the Shivapuri Nagarjun National Park check post is located. There is Nepal Army security camp for the National park. The drive is about 1 Hour From Samakhusi Chowk Kathmandu.

References

External links

Populated places in Nuwakot District